Major Rajesh Singh Adhikari, MVC (25 December 1970 – 30 May 1999),  was an Indian Army officer who died during the Kargil War. He was posthumously awarded the second highest Indian military honour, the Maha Vir Chakra for bravery on the battlefield.

Early life
Major Adhikari was born in Almora was raised in Nainital. He completed his schooling from St. Joseph's College in 1987, Intermediate from Government Inter College, Nainital and B.Sc. from Kumaon University in 1992.

Military career
He attended the Indian Military Academy, a premier military academy in India. Major Rajesh Singh was commissioned on 11 December 1993 from the Indian Military Academy.  After graduating from the Academy, he joined the 2 Mech. Infantry of the Indian Army. He was posted in 18 Grenadiers at the time of Kargil War.

Death
When heavy fighting broke out in the Kargil region of the Indian state of Jammu and Kashmir, the Indian Army was ordered to clear the heights. Many battles took place in the region. The Mechanized Infantry's Major Rajesh Singh Adhikari, the second army officer to die in the operations, had caused heavy casualties to the Pakistani forces and forced them to withdraw before succumbing to injuries in Drass sector. It was one of the most significant battles, the Battle of Tololing, where Rajesh died.

Maha Vir Chakra Citation 
The citation for the Maha Vir Chakra reads as follows:

In popular culture
In the 2003 war film LOC Kargil, Bollywood actor Karan Nath played the role of Maj. Rajesh Adhikari.

References

External links
India Today - Coming Home
Bharat-Rakshak on Rajesh Adhikari
Bharat-Rakshak on The Battle For Tololing

1999 deaths
Indian military personnel killed in action
Recipients of the Maha Vir Chakra
People of the Kargil War
People from Nainital
Military personnel from Uttarakhand
1970 births